KF Çlirimi is an Albanian football club based in Fier, Albania. The club is currently not competing in the senior football league.

External links
Second Division Standings and Stats
Albania Sport

Clirimi
1988 establishments in Albania
Sport in Fier
Association football clubs established in 1988
Kategoria e Dytë clubs